Rags and Tatters, (translit. farš wa-ġaṭa) is a 2013 Egyptian drama film written and directed by Ahmad Abdalla. It was screened in the Contemporary World Cinema section at the 2013 Toronto International Film Festival. The film was also selected in London Film Festival and Abu Dhabi Film Festival in the official competition. In November 2013, the film won the Grand Prix (The Goldne Antigone) at the Montpellier Film Festival.

Cast
 Asser Yassin
 Amr Abed
 Mohamed Mamdouh
 Latifa Fahmy as The Mother
 Yara Goubran
 Atef Yousef

Reviews
The film had positive reviews in international press such as Variety, The Guardian and Huffington Post.

References

External links
 

2013 films
2013 drama films
Egyptian independent films
2010s Arabic-language films
Egyptian drama films
2013 independent films